Hawks is the soundtrack album for the film Hawks.  All of the songs were performed by Barry Gibb (except the song "Chain Reaction", which was performed by Diana Ross).

Release
All of the songs were written and recorded in 1986 by Barry for the unreleased Moonlight Madness album with the exception of "Childhood Days" and the instrumental "Celebration de la Vie". The songs "Where Tomorrow Is", "Not in Love at All" and "Letting Go" were not in the film and were noted on the CD as bonus track not featured in the film, Additionally these recordings of "Moonlight Madness", "Cover You" and "Celebration de la Vie" are not in the film either, but appear instead as instrumental versions.

The lead single "Childhood Days" was released in the UK but did not chart, it reached number 60 in Germany. "Not in Love at All" was included on a Brazilian promotional maxi-single on Mercury Records.

Track listing

References

1988 soundtrack albums
Barry Gibb albums
Polydor Records soundtracks
Comedy film soundtracks